Erin Meyer (born August 22, 1971) is an American author and professor at  INSEAD Business School, based in Paris. She is most known for writing the 2014 book, The Culture Map: Breaking Through the Invisible Boundaries of Global Business a study that analyzes how national cultural differences impact business. She is also known for co-authoring the book with Netflix CEO, Reed Hastings, No Rules Rules: Netflix and the Culture of Reinvention, which became a New York Times best seller in October 2020.

Meyer is a professor of management practice in the Organizational Behavior department at INSEAD, an international business school with campuses in France, Singapore and Abu Dhabi. She regularly speaks about cross cultural management and global teamwork.

Personal life 
Meyer was born and raised in Minnesota. She has spent most of her adult life in Europe and Africa. Currently, she lives in Paris with her husband and two sons.

Career  
Meyer's interest in cross-cultural management dates back to her years as a Peace Corps volunteer, teaching English in Botswana. Later, she worked in HR as a director at McKesson, then at HBOC and Aperian Global. She teaches cross-cultural management at INSEAD, where she is the programme director for the Leading Across Borders and Cultures programme and lectures internationally. She has studied, for nearly two decades, how people in different parts of the world build trust, communicate, make decisions and perceive situations differently, especially in the workplace. She is also a regular contributor to Harvard Business Review.

In 2017 and again in 2019 she was selected by the Thinkers50 as one of the world's most influential business thinkers.

The Culture Map: Breaking Through the Invisible Boundaries of Global Business 
Meyer wrote her first book, The Culture Map: Breaking Through the Invisible Boundaries of Global Business in 2014. This book represents her collective research data from over thirty different countries. In the book she provides a framework for evaluating different cultures and then offers strategies for improving international success. She has identified 8 dimensions that capture most of the differences within and among cultures. Using this method, Meyer has also developed a self-assessment tool for Harvard Business Review, which helps in seeing where one falls on each of the eight scales.

The book received positive reviews from critics and the media. The Huffington Post wrote that "whether you're a corporate or traditional diplomat, global traveler, government official, or passionate world citizen, this is the one book you should not miss." and Forbes wrote that "The Culture Map stands out as a practical book to explain and frame a very difficult collection of concepts that are increasingly relevant today." In an article about the book, Inc. called it "superb."

The Eight Scales

Each of the eight scales is described as a continuum between the two ends which are diametric opposite or at least competing positions as follows:

 Communicating – Are they low-context (simple, verbose and clear), or high-context (rich deep meaning in interactions)?
 Evaluating – When giving Negative feedback does one give it directly, or prefer being indirect and discreet?
 Leading – Are people in groups egalitarian, or do they prefer hierarchy?
 Deciding – Are decisions made in consensus, or made top-down?
 Trusting – Do people base trust on how well they know each other, or how well they do work together?
 Disagreeing – Are disagreements tackled directly, or do people prefer to avoid confrontations?
 Scheduling – Do they perceive time as absolute linear points, or consider it a flexible range?
 Persuading – Do they like to hear specific cases and examples, or prefer holistic detailed explanations?

No Rules Rules: Netflix and the Culture of Reinvention 
Meyer's second book resulted from a collaboration with Reed Hastings, chairman and CEO of Netflix. This book, which the two co-authored, seeks to explain how the corporate culture at Netflix has enabled its speed, innovation and flexibility.  It is written as a handbook, providing both practical advice and steps leaders of other teams or organizations can adopt in order to also develop a highly innovative work environment.

No Rules Rules was shortlisted for the FT McKinsey best book of 2020 award and was nominated for an Outstanding Works of Literature (OWL) Award (Management and Culture).

Awards and honors 

 2017 – "Most Influential Thinker" award given to the top 30 thinkers to influence human resource practices by HR Magazine
 2017 – Thinkers50 – Selected as one of the 50 most influential business thinkers worldwide.
 2013 and 2014 – "Best Selling Case" for the case Leading Across Cultures at Michelin (The Case Center)
 2011 – "Best Case in Organizational Behavior" for the Case Leading Across Cultures at Michelin (ECCH)

References 

1971 births
Living people
American women writers
Academic staff of INSEAD
Peace Corps volunteers
People from Minnesota
American women academics
21st-century American women